Kafka: Toward a Minor Literature is a 1975 book by Gilles Deleuze and Félix Guattari.

Publication
Kafka: pour une littérature mineure was first published in French in 1975. It was translated to German in 1976 and English in 1986. Dana Polan translated the English edition as Kafka: Toward a Minor Literature for the University of Minnesota Press's "Theory and History of Literature" series.

References

Bibliography

External links
 
 

1975 non-fiction books
French non-fiction books
French-language books
University of Minnesota Press books